Serekunda (proper: Sayerr Kunda or Sere Kunda, sometimes spelled Serrekunda) is the largest urban centre in The Gambia.

History and toponymy
Sayerr Jobe, the founder of Serekunda, was a 19th-century lamane originally from the Sine-Saloum region of Senegal. He migrated to the Gambia in the mid 19th Century and is believed to have initially settled around Jinack Island in Banjul, before relocating to the southern bank of the country (near Sukuta) where he established Serrekunda.

Serekunda means "home of the Sayer [or Sayerr] family" and is named after its founder, Sayerr Jobe. The name Serrekunda (or "Sere Kunda") is a Mandinka corruption of the name Serrereh — denoting the Serer people in Mandinka, as the Mandinka people of Sabiji believed that Sayerr Jobe (the founder of Sererkunda) and his brother Massamba Koki Jobe/Diop (relative of Lat Dior - King of Cayor and Baol) and the Jobe family in general were members of the Wolof ethnic group. Thus, in the oral tradition of the Mandinkas of Sabaji (of which Serekunda was part), they initially referred to the area with the Mandinka saying: "mbitala serrereh kunda" (I am going to Serer area/country), later shortened to Serreh Kunda (or Serekunda). The word kunda or kundaa is a Mandinka word for place, area, country or compound. In essence, Sere Kunda means Serer country/area made in reference to Sayerr Jobe who was from the Serer Sine-Saloum area, and whom the Mandinkas believed to be of Serer origin. Although born in Serer country, and possessed the Serer title lamane, he was not of Serer origin, but of Lebou origin, as Jobe or Diop is a Lebou surname.

Population history

Districts or suburbs 
The following districts form part of Serekunda:

Bakoteh
Bunungka Kunda
Dippa Kunda
Eboe Town
Faji Kunda
London Corner
New Jeshwang
Old Jeshwang
Kololi
Kotu
Latri Kunda
Latri Kunda Sabiji
Manjai Kunda
Serekunda District
Talinding Kunjang
Churchill's Town

Gallery

References

External links

Hotels, Photos and Maps for Serekunda

 
Populated places in the Gambia
Serer country